Han Kang (born November 27, 1970) is a South Korean writer. She won the Man Booker International Prize for fiction in 2016 for The Vegetarian, a novel about a woman's descent into mental illness and neglect from her family. The novel is also one of the first of her books to be translated into English.

Life
Han Kang is the daughter of novelist Han Seung-won. She was born in Gwangju and at the age of 10, moved to Suyuri (of which she speaks affectionately in her novel Greek Lessons) in Seoul. She studied Korean literature at Yonsei University. Her brother Han Dong Rim is also a writer. She began her published career when five of her poems, including "Winter in Seoul," were featured in the Winter 1993 issue of the quarterly Literature and Society. She made her fiction debut in the following year when her short story "The Scarlet Anchor" was the winning entry in the Seoul Shinmun Spring Literary Contest. Since then, she has gone on to win the Yi Sang Literary Prize (2005), Today's Young Artist Award, and the Korean Literature Novel Award. Han has taught creative writing at the Seoul Institute of the Arts and is currently working on her sixth novel.

Han has stated that she suffers periodically from migraines, and credits these migraines with "keeping her humble."

Work
Han's debut work, A Love of Yeosu, was published in 1995 and attracted attention for its precise and tightly narrated composition. Han wrote The Vegetarian, and its sister-work, Mongolian Mark by hand, as overuse of the computer keyboard had damaged her wrist. It has been reported that in her college years Han became obsessed with a line of poetry by the Korean modernist poet Yi Sang: "I believe that humans should be plants." She understood Yi's line to imply a defensive stance against the violence of Korea's colonial history under Japanese occupation, and took it as an inspiration to write her most successful work, The Vegetarian. The Vegetarian was Han's first novel translated into English, although she had already attracted worldwide attention by the time Deborah Smith translated the novel into English. There has been some controversy over the translation of the novel, as scholars have detected mistakes in it; among other issues, there is concern that Smith may have attributed some of the dialogue to the wrong characters. The translated work won the Man Booker International Prize 2016 for them both. She is the first Korean to be nominated for the award. The work was also chosen as one of "The 10 Best Books of 2016" from NYTimes Book Review.
Han's third novel, The White Book, was shortlisted for the 2018 International Booker Prize.

Han's literary career began when she published five poems including “Winter in Seoul", in the winter issue of Literature and Society in 1993. Her career in fiction began the following year when her story "Red Anchor" won the Seoul Shinmun Spring Literary Contest. Her first story collection, Love of Yeosu, was published in 1995. In 1998, Han participated in a program at the University of Iowa International Writing Program. Her works published in Korea include Fruits of My Woman (2000) and Fire Salamander (2012); novels including The Black Deer (1998), Your Cold Hand (2002), The Vegetarian (2007), Breath Fighting (2010), Greek Lessons (2011), Human Acts (2014), The White Book (2016), and We Do Not Part (2021) ; poetry I Put the Evening in the Drawer (2013); essay books including Love, and the Things Around the Love (2003), Quietly Sung Songs (2007).

Han is also a musician and interested in visual art, and her work often reflects this multi-disciplinary focus. "Your Cold Hand (2002)" revolves around the story of a sculptor and his model. When she published an essay book Quietly Sung Songs (2007), she released a CD with ten songs that she composed, wrote lyrics for and recorded. At first she was not intending to sing, but Han Jung Rim, a musician and music director, insisted Han should record the songs herself.

Han won the 25th Korean Novel Award with her novella Baby Buddha in 1999, the 2000 Today's Young Artist Award, the 2005 Yi-Sang Literary Award with Mongolian Mark, and the 2010 Dong-ni Literary Award with Breath Fighting. Baby Buddha and The Vegetarian have been made into films. The Vegetarian was turned into a movie that was one of only 14 selections (out of 1,022 submissions) for inclusion in the World Narrative Competition of the prestigious North American Film Fest. The film was also a critical success at the Busan International Film Festival.

Mongolian Mark won the Yi Sang Literary Award. The rest of the series (The Vegetarian and Fire Tree) were delayed by contractual problems. Han was the youngest to receive Yi Sang Literary Award in 2005 until 2013 when Kim Aeran received it at the age of 32. Her Human Acts  was released in January 2016 from Portobello Books. Han has been chosen to win the Malaparte Prize 2017 with the Italian translation of Human Acts, "Atti Umani" from Adelphi Edizioni, 2017 in Italy on 1 October 2017.

Han Kang's 2017 autobiographical novel The White Book centers on the loss of her older sister, a baby who died two hours after her birth. In 2018 Kang became the fifth writer chosen to contribute to the Future Library project.

Awards
 Korean Fiction Award (1999)
 Ministry of Culture and Tourism Today's Young Artist Award - Literature Section (2000)
 Yi Sang Literary Award Grand Prize (2005)
 Dong-ni Literary Award (2010)
 Manhae Literary Award (2014)
 Hwang Sun-won Literary Award (2015)
 Man Booker International Prize (2016)
 Malaparte Prize (2017)
 Kim Yu-jeong Literary Award (2018)
 San Clemente Literary Prize (2019)

Select translated works
 Convalescence (Translated by Jeon Seung-hee. ASIA Publishers, 2013) 
 The Vegetarian: A Novel (Translated by Deborah Smith. Portobello Books, 2015) 
 Human Acts  (Translated by Deborah Smith. Portobello Books, 2016) 
 The White Book (Translated by Deborah Smith. Portobello Books, 2017) 
 Greek Lessons

See also
 Korean literature
 List of Korean novelists
 List of Korean-language poets
 List of Korean female writers

References

External links

South Korean women novelists
South Korean novelists
1970 births
Living people
Yonsei University alumni
International Writing Program alumni
20th-century novelists
20th-century South Korean women writers
21st-century novelists
21st-century South Korean women writers
People from Gwangju
International Booker Prize winners